Aldo Teqja (born 4 May 1995) is an Albanian professional footballer who plays as a goalkeeper for Albanian club FK Partizani Tirana.

Club career

Anorthosis Famagusta
Teqja joined Cypriot club Anorthosis Famagusta in January 2011 from Dinamo Tirana for a reported fee of €60,000 as the side's first winter signing. He initially joined the youth team at the club before being promoted to the first team ahead to the 2013–14 season, where he acted as an understudy for Mathieu Valverde and Mario Vega. He made his professional debut on 3 May 2014 in a home tie against Omonia Nicosia which ended in a 2–1 defeat. Until the end of the season 2013-14 Teqja counted 3 appearances with Anorthosis Famagusta with one match without conceded a goal. In the penultimate game of the season he conceded 8 goals against APOEL FC as he finished the season with 3 league appearances.

Loaned to Elpida Xylofagou
On 22 August 2014 he was loaned out to Elpida Xylofagou in order to gain more first team experience, especially following the arrival of Thomas Kaminski from Anderlecht at Anorthosis Famagusta.

Albania
After more than 5 years spent in Cyprus, Teqja was returned in Albania singing for Albanian Superliga side FK Kukësi managed by Klodian Duro on 18 June 2016.

On 4 July 2019 FK Partizani Tirana confirmed, that Teqja had joined the club on a one-year deal.

International career

Albania U15 
Teqja received his first international level call-up at age of 14 by coach Sulejman Demollari of the Albania national under-15 football team, which were just founded in 2009 for participating in the 2010 Summer Youth Olympics (Football). He made his under-15 debut on 17 October by featuring full-90 minutes in the semi-final qualification round match against Liechtenstein which ended in a 2–0 win. Then the team advanced to the final where they faced Montenegro two days later, losing 1–2 as Teqja played another full-90 minute match, missing their participation in the 2010 Summer Youth Olympics finals.

Albania U17

Albania U19
Teqja was called up to the Albania national under-19 football team to participate in the 2013 UEFA European Under-19 Championship qualification, coached by Foto Strakosha. Teqja didn't manage to play any minutes in the Group 7 matches as coach Foto Strakosha played with Thomas Strakosha as an undisputed starter.

Albania U20
Teqja was called up at Albania national under-20 football team by coach Skënder Gega to participate in the 2013 Mediterranean Games football tournament which began on 19 June 2013 in Mersin, Turkey. Teqja played in all 5 Albania U20s matches in which 4 of them were full 90-minutes, 1 as starter until second-half where he was substituted off for Marsel Çaka. Albania U20 was ranked in the last place out of 8 teams.

Career statistics

Club

Honours

Club

Skënderbeu Korçë
Albanian Cup Runner-up: 2016–17
Albanian Supercup Runner-up: 2016

References

External links

Anorthosis.com - Player Profile
Cfa.com.cy - Player Profile
 Aldo Teqja profile at FSHF.org

1995 births
Living people
Footballers from Tirana
Albanian footballers
Association football goalkeepers
Albania youth international footballers
Albania under-21 international footballers
Anorthosis Famagusta F.C. players
KF Skënderbeu Korçë players
FK Partizani Tirana players
Cypriot First Division players
Cypriot Second Division players
Kategoria Superiore players
Albanian expatriate footballers
Expatriate footballers in Cyprus
Albanian expatriate sportspeople in Cyprus
Competitors at the 2013 Mediterranean Games
Mediterranean Games competitors for Albania